The 2011 Netball Superleague season (known for sponsorship reasons as the FIAT Netball Superleague) was the sixth season of the Netball Superleague. The league was won by Hertfordshire Mavericks. In the grand final Hertfordshire Mavericks defeated Surrey Storm. For the first time, the season was completed in a single calendar year, starting on 22 January and concluding on 9 June with the grand final. Fiat Group Automobiles became the Netball Superleague's new sponsor.

Teams

Regular season
Hertfordshire Mavericks finished top of the table during the regular season after winning 14 games, losing just one game all season. Mavericks confirmed their place at the top of the table after a win and a draw during the final weekend of the regular season. On Saturday, 14 May they defeated Celtic Dragons 49–41 away and Sunday, 15 May they drew 48–48 draw with Surrey Storm at home.

Final table

Playoffs
The play-offs utilised the Page–McIntyre system to determine the two grand finalists. This saw the top two from the regular season, Hertfordshire Mavericks and Northern Thunder, play each other, with the winner going straight through to the grand final. The loser gets a second chance to reach the grand final via the minor final. The third and fourth placed teams, Team Bath and Surrey Storm also play each other, and the winner advances to the minor final. The winner of the minor final qualifies for the grand final.

Minor semi-final

Major semi-final

Minor final

Grand Final

References

 
2011
 
2011 in Welsh women's sport
2011 in Scottish women's sport